Dimitrios Afentoulidis (born 21 July 1974) is a Greek former professional footballer who played as a midfielder.

References

1974 births
Living people
Greek footballers
Kastoria F.C. players
Ionikos F.C. players
Chalkidona F.C. players
Marko F.C. players
Vyzas F.C. players
Super League Greece players
Association football midfielders